The United States District Court for the Eastern District of Washington (in case citations, E.D. Wash.)  is the federal district court whose jurisdiction comprises the following counties of the state of Washington: Adams, Asotin, Benton, Chelan, Columbia, Douglas, Ferry, Franklin, Garfield, Grant, Kittitas, Klickitat, Lincoln, Okanogan, Pend Oreille, Spokane, Stevens, Walla Walla, Whitman, and Yakima.

As of the 2000 United States census, 1.3 million people resided in the Eastern District, representing 22% of the state's population. The district includes the cities of Richland, Spokane, and Yakima, among others. The Federal Court in Yakima is located in the William O. Douglas Federal Building.

Cases from the Eastern District of Washington are appealed to the United States Court of Appeals for the Ninth Circuit, except for patent claims and claims against the U.S. government under the Tucker Act, which are appealed to the Federal Circuit.

The United States Attorney's Office for the Eastern District of Washington represents the United States in civil and criminal litigation in the court.

 United States Attorney is Vanessa Waldref.

Current judges
:

Vacancies and pending nominations

Former judges

Chief judges

Succession of seats

See also
 Courts of Washington
 List of current United States district judges
 List of United States federal courthouses in Washington

References

External links
 

Washington, Eastern District
Tri-Cities, Washington
Spokane, Washington
Yakima, Washington
1905 establishments in Washington (state)
Richland, Washington
Courthouses in Washington (state)
Eastern Washington
Courts and tribunals established in 1905